Parapercis dongshaensis is a fish species in the sandperch family, Pinguipedidae. It is found in the South China Sea near Dongsha Island. 
This species can reach a length of  TL.

References

Pinguipedidae
Taxa named by Chen I-Shiung
Fish described in 2010